Ken Joseph Russell (born June 24, 1973) is an American politician and yo-yo champion from the state of Florida. A member of the Democratic Party, he  served on the Miami City Commission from 2015 to 2022.

Early life and career
Russell was born in Doctors Hospital in Coral Gables, Florida, and raised in Coconut Grove and Key Biscayne. Russell's father, Jack, was an international yo-yo champion and developed a patent on his brand of yo-yo. Jack worked for the Duncan Toys Company before breaking off to start his own. His mother, Kazuyo, was Japan's national yo-yo champion. The family moved from Miami to Stuart, Florida, after Hurricane David in 1979. Russell graduated from Martin County High School in 1991.

When he was 15 years old, Russell became a professional and went on international yo-yo tours. He attended the University of North Carolina at Chapel Hill. He earned a Bachelor of Science in Business Administration. After graduating, he went to work for his family's company. After the business suffered during the Great Recession, Russell opened a watersports store.

Political career
Russell became involved in local politics in 2013 when he and other residents of Coconut Grove insisted that the city remove, rather than cover, toxic soil from a park. In 2015, Russell ran to represent District 2 on the Miami City Commission; incumbent Marc Sarnoff was prevented from running again due to term limits. Russell won the election with 42 percent; though he did not earn enough votes to automatically avoid a runoff, the second place finisher withdrew from the race. He was reelected to a second term on the city commission in 2019.

In 2021, Russell announced that he would run for the U.S. Senate in the 2022 election. After determining that Val Demings was likely to win the Democratic nomination in the Senate race, he switched his candidacy to the U.S. House of Representatives for Florida's 27th district in May 2022. Russell lost the primary election on August 23 to Annette Taddeo.

Russell resigned from the Miami City Commission to run for Congress. He initially chose to resign effective January 3, 2023, but left office on December 29, 2022.

Personal life
Russell and his wife, Juliana, have two daughters.

References

External links

1973 births
American politicians of Japanese descent
Asian-American city council members
Candidates in the 2022 United States House of Representatives elections
Florida city council members
Florida Democrats
Living people
People from Coral Gables, Florida
University of North Carolina at Chapel Hill alumni
Yo-yo performers